The Municipal District of Willow Creek No. 26 is a municipal district (MD) in southern Alberta, Canada. Located in Census Division No. 3, its municipal office is located adjacent to Claresholm Industrial Airport, west of the Town of Claresholm.

History 
The MD of Willow Creek No. 26 was incorporated on January 1, 1954.

Geography

Communities and localities 
The following urban municipalities are surrounded by the MD of Willow Creek No. 26.
Cities
none
Towns
Claresholm
Fort Macleod
Nanton
Stavely
Villages
none
Summer villages
none

The following hamlets are located within the MD of Willow Creek No. 26.
Hamlets
Granum
Moon River Estates
Orton
Parkland
Woodhouse

The following localities are located within the MD of Willow Creek No. 26.
Localities 

Ardenville
Blacktail
Durward
Furman
Lyndon
Mekastoe

Muirhead
Nolan
Pearce
Pulteney
Spring Point
Stowe

Demographics 

In the 2016 Census of Population conducted by Statistics Canada, the MD of Willow Creek No. 26 had a population of 5,179 living in 1,671 of its 1,863 total private dwellings, a  change from its 2011 population of 5,107.

See also 
List of communities in Alberta
List of municipal districts in Alberta

References

External links 

 
Willow Creek